Yusuf Ali or Yousaf Ali is a common name. Yusuf Ali may refer to:

 Abdullah Yusuf Ali (1872–1953), Indian Islamic scholar, known for his English translation of the Quran
 Muhammad Yusuf Ali (1923–1998), Bangladesh politician
 Yusuf Ali Kechery, poet and film director
 Yusuf Ali Kenadid, Somali ruler
 Yusuf Ali Chowdhury, Bengali Muslim politician in South Asia
 Yusuf Alli, Nigerian long jumper

See also 
 Yusuf
 Ali (name)

Arabic masculine given names